

Surname 
 Andrew Bannatyne, Scottish-Canadian politician, 1829–1889
 Very Rev Colin Bannatyne (1849-1920) twice Moderator of the General Assembly of the Free Church of Scotland
 Duncan Bannatyne, 1949 –, Scottish entrepreneur
 George Bannatyne, 1545–1608, collector of Scottish poems
 James Bannatyne, 1975 –, New Zealand football player
 Lesley Bannatyne, American author
 Richard Bannatyne, – 1605, Scottish clergy
 William Bannatyne, Lord Bannatyne, 1743–1833, Scottish lawyer and judge

Middle name 
 Robert Bannatyne Finlay, 1842–1929, British doctor, lawyer, and politician
 Thomas Bannatyne Gillies, 1828–1889, New Zealand politician

See also
Ballantine (surname)
Bannatyne (disambiguation)